The Greater Sydney Rams, originally known as the Western Sydney Rams,  is a former rugby union team from Australia that was disbanded in 2018. The Rams won the minor premiership in the 2007 Australian Rugby Championship (ARC), and then competed in the National Rugby Championship (NRC) from 2014 to 2017.

The Greater Sydney Rams team in the NRC took its identity from the Rams side that was founded in 2007. Australia's national competition was discontinued following the first season in 2007 but, after an absence of six years, the ARC was relaunched as the NRC in 2014.

The revived Rams team for 2014 was backed by a syndicate of private investors in partnership with four Sydney rugby clubs; Parramatta, Penrith, Southern Districts and West Harbour. The Eastwood club was initially included in the partnership but withdrew prior to the 2014 season.

In 2017 the Rams were taken over by the Eastwood Rugby Union Club, for what was to be their last season in the competition. A restructure for the 2018 season removed the Rams from the NRC, leaving only two sides from New South Wales in the competition; the Rays and the Eagles.

Name and colours
The inspiration for the name Rams derived from the pioneering past of Western Sydney; and as recognition of the settlers that started the Australian sheep and wool industries in Parramatta. The original orange and blue colours of the Rams were unveiled at the ARC team's launch in March 2007. White was added to the collar of the jersey and base of the sleeves in 2014, and a predominantly white and blue kit with orange highlights was introduced when Eastwood took ownership of the team for the 2017 season.

History
In 2007, an attempt was made to form a third tier of rugby in Australia, similar to New Zealand's ITM Cup and South Africa's Currie Cup. The new competition, called the Australian Rugby Championship, included eight teams. Three of those teams were based in New South Wales, including a Western Sydney team based at Parramatta.

ARC: Western Sydney Rams 2007
The clubs aligned with the Western Sydney Rams in 2007 were Eastwood, West Harbour, Parramatta and Penrith. All competed in the Tooheys New Cup and Shute Shield club competitions. The Rams' local rivals in the ARC were the Sydney Fleet and the Central Coast Rays. The three ARC teams from New South Wales were aligned with existing clubs and regions.

Brian Melrose was the head coach of the Rams in 2007. Melrose had coaching roles with Manly and the Australian Sevens team and was previously an assistant coach to the Waratahs. He played for Parramatta, West Harbour and Eastwood before taking up coaching.

The Western Sydney Rams played at Parramatta Stadium, which then had an all-seater capacity of 20,000. The Rams were the minor premiers of the 2007 ARC season. The team was knocked out of the 2007 finals by the Melbourne Rebels at the semi-final stage.

The Australian Rugby Championship was terminated at the end of 2007 after only one season of competition, with the Australian Rugby Union citing higher costs than budgeted and further projected financial losses. The Western Sydney Rams team was disbanded with the end of the ARC competition.

Greater Sydney Rams 2014–2015

The National Rugby Championship was announced in December 2013 to commence in 2014 with expressions of interest open to any interested parties with accepted bids to be announced early 2014.

In March 2014 it was announced that the Rams would be revived as the Greater Sydney Rams to compete in the new National Rugby Championship, and the team's original colours from the ARC would be maintained.

The new Rams team, representing Greater Sydney, was formed by Greater Sydney Rams Pty Ltd – a syndicate of private investors in partnership with (initially) five Shute Shield clubs: Eastwood, Parramatta, Penrith, Southern Districts, and West Harbour. In late June 2014, Eastwood withdrew financial backing from the Rams, and ended their formal association with the team. The Rams' shareholdings were split, with three quarters being held by the syndicate of investors and the remainder held by the clubs (5% being kept aside for Eastwood should they wish to become a partner).

A law firm, People + Culture Strategies (PCS), was announced as the Rams' naming rights partner for the 2014 to 2016 seasons.

The Rams appointed Brian Melrose as head coach for the 2014 season, renewing their association with the coach that took the Western Sydney Rams to the minor premiership in 2007. For the first NRC match of 2014 the Rams named 21-year-old Jed Holloway, from the Southern Districts club, as captain of the team. In 2015, former Wallaby assistant coach Jim Williams was appointed Rams coach.

Western Sydney Rams: 2016
The franchise reverted to its original name of Western Sydney Rams for the 2016 NRC season. Consideration was given to the Southern Districts Rugby Club switching to the newly renamed Sydney Rays, but the club decided to remain a shareholder of the Rams. Former Australian assistant coach John Muggleton was named as the Rams' new head coach for the 2016 season, with Jeremy Paul and Joel Wilson appointed as assistant coaches.

The team played their home matches out of Concord Oval but only won two matches for the year, finishing the regular season in sixth place and did not make the semifinal stage of the competition.

Greater Sydney Rams: 2017
The Rams franchise underwent a restructure in 2017, reverting to the Greater Sydney Rams name again when Eastwood Rugby Club took over control of the licence. The team's home ground was moved to TG Millner Field.

Before the start of the 2018 season, an announcement from NSW Rugby on 6 June 2018 stated that only two teams from New South Wales would be included in the NRC for that year. Reverting to one team each from the city and country meant that the Rams were removed from the competition.

Sponsorship
The Rams naming rights sponsor in 2014 was the workplace relations law firm, People + Culture Strategies (PCS). Other partners in the 2014 season included financial advice firm Evalesco Financial Services, owned by Jeff Thurecht and Marshall Brentnall, ARC Group, owned by Cameron Ryan and Pacific Restaurants, chaired by businessman Rick Hutchinson, and the University of Western Sydney.

In the 2015 and 2016 seasons the RAMS were sponsored by People + Culture Strategies, ARC Group, Evalesco Financial Services and The Digital Athlete. In the 2017 season the RAMS were sponsored by People + Culture Strategies and major international property investment company Brookfield

Stadium

The Rams initially played at Parramatta Stadium in 2014, home of the National Rugby League club, the Parramatta Eels, and A-league team Western Sydney Wanderers. The site was originally known as Cumberland Oval and rugby union was played there from 1879 through to 1939. The old wooden grandstand was burnt down in the early 1980s and Cumberland Oval was redeveloped into Parramatta Stadium which opened in 1986.

In 2015, the Rams consortium clubs of Parramatta and Southern Districts also hosted home matches. In 2016, the Rams played out of Concord Oval, which hosted eight matches during the 1987 Rugby World Cup, including a semifinal. The Rams played all their home games for 2017 at TG Millner Field, the home ground of Eastwood Rugby Club in the Shute Shield competition.

Records

Honours
 Playoff appearances: 2007 (ARC)

Season standings
National Rugby Championship
{| class="wikitable" style="text-align:center;"
|- border=1 cellpadding=5 cellspacing=0
! style="width:20px;"|Year
! style="width:20px;"|Pos
! style="width:20px;"|Pld
! style="width:20px;"|W
! style="width:20px;"|D
! style="width:20px;"|L
! style="width:20px;"|F
! style="width:20px;"|A
! style="width:25px;"|+/-
! style="width:20px;"|BP
! style="width:20px;"|Pts
! style="width:25em; text-align:left;"|  Play-offs
|-
|2017
|7th
| 8 || 3 || 0 || 5 || 248 || 319 || –71 || 1 || 13
|align=left|  Did not compete
|-
|2016
|6th
| 7 || 2 || 0 || 5 || 264 || 266 ||  −2 || 5 || 13
|align=left|  Did not compete
|-
|2015
|9th
| 8 || 1 || 0 || 7 || 242 || 363 || −121 || 3 || 7
|align=left|  Did not compete
|-
|2014
|5th
| 8 || 3 || 1 || 4 || 254 || 265 || −11 || 2 || 16 
|align=left|  Did not compete
|}

Australian Rugby Championship
{| class="wikitable" style="text-align:center;"
|- border=1 cellpadding=5 cellspacing=0
! style="width:20px;"|Year
! style="width:20px;"|Pos
! style="width:20px;"|Pld
! style="width:20px;"|W
! style="width:20px;"|D
! style="width:20px;"|L
! style="width:20px;"|F
! style="width:20px;"|A
! style="width:25px;"|+/-
! style="width:20px;"|BP
! style="width:20px;"|Pts
! style="width:25em; text-align:left;"|  Play-offs
|-
|2007
|1st
| 8 || 5 || 0 || 3 || 239 || 149 || +90 || 7 || 27
|align=left|  
|}

Head coaches
 John Manenti (2017) 
 John Muggleton (2016) 
 Jim Williams (2015) 
 Brian Melrose (2007, 2014)

Captains
Jed Holloway (2017) 
Paul Asquith (2016)
Jed Holloway (2014–15)
Lachie Turner (2007)

Squads
{| class="collapsible collapsed" style=" width: 100%; margin: 0px; border: 1px solid darkgray; border-spacing: 3px;"
|-
! colspan="10" style="background-color:#f2f2f2; cell-border:2px solid black; padding-left: 1em; padding-right: 1em; text-align: center;" |2017 Greater Sydney Rams squad – NRC
|-
| colspan="10"|The squad for the 2017 National Rugby Championship season:

|-
| width="3%"| 
| width="30%" style="font-size: 95%;" valign="top"|

Props
 Duncan Chubb
 Jed Gillespie
 Sekope Kepu1
 Robert Lagudi
 Andrew Tuala

Hookers
 Nathan Charles
 Gunnz Fuavao
 Hugh Roach

Locks
 Adrian Hall
 Fergus Lee-Warner
 Joshua Redfern
 Sam Thomson
 Albert Tuisue

| width="3%"| 
| width="30%" style="font-size: 95%;" valign="top"|

Loose Forwards
 Kotoni Ale
 Jed Holloway
 David Hickey
 Kelly Peniata Meafua

Scrum-halves
  Matt Gonzalez
 Josh Holmes
 Nick Phipps1

Fly-halves
 Jai Ayoub
 Kodie Hawkins
 Stu Dunbar
 Mack Mason

| width="3%"| 
| width="30%" style="font-size: 95%;" valign="top"|

Centres
 Kurtley Beale1
 Ben Cotton
 Kevin Fuavao
 Tevita Piukana
 Dennis Pili-Gaitau

Wingers
 Cam Bailey
 John Grant
 Taqele Naiyaravoro

Fullbacks
 Israel Folau1
 Liam Windon

(c) Team captainBold denotes internationally capped players at the time1 Allocated national player additional to contracted squad.
|}

{| class="collapsible collapsed" style=" width: 100%; margin: 0px; border: 1px solid darkgray; border-spacing: 3px;"
|-
! colspan="10" style="background-color:#f2f2f2; cell-border:2px solid black; padding-left: 1em; padding-right: 1em; text-align: center;" |2016 Western Sydney Rams squad – NRC
|-
| colspan="10"|The squad for the 2016 National Rugby Championship season:

|-
| width="3%"| 
| width="30%" style="font-size: 95%;" valign="top"|

Props
 Mesake Doge
 Matt Gibbon
 Vunipola Fifita
 David Lolohea
 Jack Payne
 Andrew Tuala

Hookers
 Aaron Blacklock
 Brandon Paenga-Amosa
 Hugh Roach

Locks
 Ngaruhe Jones
 Bradford Kapa
 Senio Toleafoa
 Will Skelton
 Albert Tuisue

| width="3%"| 
| width="30%" style="font-size: 95%;" valign="top"|

Loose Forwards
 Tom Alexander
 Taunaola Kei
 Jordan Tuapou
 Filimone Tufui
 Tyrone Viiga

Scrum-halves
 Scott Gale
 Harrison Goddard
 Waldo Wessels

Fly-halves
 Mitchell Walton
 Vatemo Ravouvou

| width="3%"| 
| width="30%" style="font-size: 95%;" valign="top"|

Centres
 Paul Asquith (c)
 Robaleibau Buaserau
 Denny Godinet
 David Minute
 Apolosi Latunipulu

Wingers
 Fabian Goodall
 Selestino Kalounivale
 Luke Smart

Fullbacks
 Albert Nikoro
 Cyril Reece

(c) Team captainBold denotes internationally capped players at the time1 Allocated national player additional to contracted squad.
|}

{| class="collapsible collapsed" style=" width: 100%; margin: 0px; border: 1px solid darkgray; border-spacing: 3px;"
|-
! colspan="10" style="background-color:#f2f2f2; cell-border:2px solid black; padding-left: 1em; padding-right: 1em; text-align: center;" |2015 Greater Sydney Rams squad – NRC
|-
| colspan="10"|The squad for the 2015 National Rugby Championship season:

|-
| width="3%"| 
| width="30%" style="font-size: 95%;" valign="top"|

Props
 Cameron Betham
 Matt Gibbon
 Jed Gillespie
 Samuel Needs
 Cameron Orr
 Benn Robinson1

Hookers
 Tatafu Polota-Nau1
 Siliva Siliva
 Hugh Roach

Locks
 Evan Olmstead
 Filimore Tufui

| width="3%"| 
| width="30%" style="font-size: 95%;" valign="top"|

Loose Forwards
 Marcus Carbone
 Jonathan Hayes
 Jed Holloway (c)
 Cohen Masson
 Kelly Meafua

Scrum-halves
 Kaleb Rech
 De Wet Roos

Fly-halves
 Jai Ayoub
 Kurtley Beale1
 Rohan Saifoloi

| width="3%"| 
| width="30%" style="font-size: 95%;" valign="top"|

Centres
 Paul Asquith
 Denny Godinet
 Michael McDougall
 Jordan Heyer
 Henry Seavula
 Henry Taufua

Wingers
 Brad Curtis
 Rob Horne1
 Afa Pakalani

Fullbacks
 Brenden Hartmann

(c) Team captainBold denotes internationally capped players at the time1 Allocated national player additional to contracted squad.
|}

{| class="collapsible collapsed" style=" width: 100%; margin: 0px; border: 1px solid darkgray; border-spacing: 3px;"
|-
! colspan="10" style="background-color:#f2f2f2; cell-border:2px solid black; padding-left: 1em; padding-right: 1em; text-align: center;" |2014 Greater Sydney Rams squad – NRC
|-
| colspan="10"|The squad for the 2014 National Rugby Championship season:
|-
| width="3%"| 
| width="30%" style="font-size: 95%;" valign="top"|

Props
 Ben Alexander1
  Rhys Brodie
  Jed Gillespie
  Dave Lolohea
  Guy Millar
 Benn Robinson

Hookers
  Maile Ngauamo
 Tatafu Polota-Nau1
 Peni Ravai
 Hugh Roach

Locks
  Jared Barry
  Andrew Clyne
 Jed Holloway (c)
  Dylan Sigg
  Senio Toleafoa

| width="3%"| 
| width="30%" style="font-size: 95%;" valign="top"|

Loose Forwards
 Chris Alcock
 Marcus Carbone
 Michael Kovacic
 Sakaria Noa
 Hugh Perrett
 Patrick Sio

Scrum-halves
 Auvasa Faleali'i
 Mark Swanepoel

Fly-halves
 Jai Ayoub
 Kurtley Beale1
 Ben Volavola

| width="3%"| 
| width="30%" style="font-size: 95%;" valign="top"|

Centres
 Lalakai Foketi
 Tom Hill
 Tevita Kuridrani1
 Apolosi Latunipulu
 Michael McDougall
 Henry Seavula
 Henry Taufua

Wingers
 Dane Chisholm
 Rob Horne1
 Taqele Naiyaravoro

Fullbacks
 Ben Batger
 Jerome McKenzie

(c) Team captainBold denotes internationally capped players at the time1 Allocated national player additional to contracted squad.
|}

{| class="collapsible collapsed" style=" width: 100%; margin: 0px; border: 1px solid darkgray; border-spacing: 3px;"
|-
! colspan="10" style="background-color:#f2f2f2; cell-border:2px solid black; padding-left: 1em; padding-right: 1em; text-align: center;" |2007 Western Sydney Rams squad – ARC
|-
| width="3%"| 
| width="30%" style="font-size: 95%;" valign="top"|

Props
 Ben Alexander
 Aaron Broughton-Rouse
 James Lakepa
 Peter Niumata
 Benn Robinson

Hookers
 Josh Mann-Rea
 Tatafu Polota-Nau
 Ben Roberts

Locks
 Ben Hand (c)
 Van Humphries
 Marty Wilson
 Sam Wykes

| width="3%"| 
| width="30%" style="font-size: 95%;" valign="top"|

Loose Forwards
 Wil Brame
 Ben Coridas
 Mark Howell
 Gareth Palamo
 Hugh Perrett
 Tom Egan

Scrum-halves
 Josh Holmes
 Dave Rimmer

Fly-halves
 Kurtley Beale
 Josh Weeks
 Fa'atonu Fili

| width="3%"| 
| width="30%" style="font-size: 95%;" valign="top"|

Centres
 Rory Sidey
 Luke Johnson
 Chris Siale

Wings
 Filipo Toala
 Lachlan Mitchell

Fullbacks
 Ben Martin
 Lachie Turner (c)

(c) Team captainBold denotes internationally capped players at the time
|}

Gallery

See also

 New South Wales Rugby Union (NSWRU)
 New South Wales Waratahs
 Shute Shield

References

External links
 Greater Sydney Rams on facebook.com
 Greater Sydney Rams on twitter.com

Archives

National Rugby Championship
2007 establishments in Australia
Rugby clubs established in 2007
Rugby union teams in Sydney
Sports clubs disestablished in 2018
2018 disestablishments in Australia